Brixmor Property Group is a publicly traded Real Estate Investment Trust that primarily invests in shopping malls. They own and operate over 400 open-air shopping centers totaling over 73 million square feet of retail space. Brixmor Property Group is the real estate broker to over 5000 companies in the United States including: the TJX Companies, Kroger, Publix Super Markets, Walmart, Ross Stores, and LA Fitness. Brixmor was started in Maryland and is now headquartered in New York City.

Investments
As of December 31, 2019, the company owned interests in 403 shopping centers comprising 71 million square feet.

Brixmors properties in Texas, Florida, and California each account for approximately 11% of the company's revenues.

The company's largest tenants are as follows:

History
Brixmor Property Group's history traces back in late 2003 when Centro Properties Group an Australian shopping mall firm, entered the United States market by the purchase of 14 neighborhood, community and power centers in California. As a result, Centro Properties Group made a joint venture with American-based Watt Commercial Realty to form Centro Watt, to handle their acquired properties. In 2005, Centro acquired Kramont Reality Trust in a $1.2 billion deal. More expansion happened when on May 9, 2006, Sydney-based Westfield Group announces the sale of seven shopping malls which Centro Watt acquired. In 2007, Centro acquired Watt Companies ownership stake, ending the joint venture and renamed the company Centro Properties Group US. Centro Properties Group US acquired more shopping malls and REIT companies as the years went on.

In 2011, The Blackstone Group acquired Centro Properties Group US from Centro Retail Trust, and the resulting entity changed its name to Brixmor.

In 2012, the company hired Madison Marquette to be the manager for 7 former Westfield Group malls.

In October 2013, the company became a public company via initial public offering.

In April 2016, president and CEO Michael Carroll, CFO Michael Pappagallo, and chief accounting officer Steven Splain resigned after an accounting scandal. Jim Taylor was named CEO and president.

In August 2016, The Blackstone Group reduced its stake in the company to 14%.

References

External links

Financial services companies based in New York City
Real estate investment trusts of the United States